The City is a lost 1926 silent film produced and released by the Fox Film Corporation. It was directed by Roy William Neill and is based on Clyde Fitch's 1909 Broadway play. A previous film on Fitch's play appeared in 1916. This version has been updated to contemporary 1926.

Plot
After the death of Rand, the breadwinner, a former criminal who has honestly rebuilt his life, his family members move to the city, where Rand junior soon finds himself running for mayor. The wife, on the other hand, neglects the family to pursue her social ambitions while young Cicely is tricked by Hannock, a drug addict who is responsible for the death of old Rand. Knowing the dead man's background, Hannock now blackmails George, his son, who eventually gives up his political ambitions and confronts the blackmailer. The latter ends up committing suicide and the family hurries to leave the city to return to the village.

Cast
May Allison as Elinor Voorhees
Robert Frazer - George Rand Jr.
George Irving - George Rand Sr.
Lillian Elliott - Mrs. Elliott
Walter McGrail - Jim Hannock
Richard Walling - Chad Morris
Nancy Nash as Cicely Rand
Melbourne MacDowell - Vorhees
Bodil Rosing - Sarah
Fred Walton

See also
1937 Fox vault fire

References

External links

The City lobby poster

1926 films
American silent feature films
American films based on plays
Films directed by Roy William Neill
Fox Film films
Lost American films
1926 drama films
Silent American drama films
American black-and-white films
1926 lost films
Lost drama films
1920s American films